Aurelius W. Hutton (1847–1934), known as A.W. Hutton, was a Superior Court judge and Los Angeles, California, city attorney. He sat on a special jury that investigated charges made by land developer Abbot Kinney.

Biography
Hutton was born in Greene County, Alabama on July 23, 1847, and was educated at the University of Virginia. He came to Los Angeles in 1869 after having fought in the Confederate Army.

He was Los Angeles city attorney in 1872–76 and a judge of the Superior Court. In August 1898, he was chairman of a rally at Hazard's Pavilion on behalf of James G. Maguire, candidate for governor of California.

In 1904 Hutton was chairman of a specially appointed jury that heard charges by real estate developer and fruit grower Abbot Kinney against A. H. Naftzger. president of the California Fruit Agency and nominal head of the Southern California Fruit Exchange. He filed a 15-page dissent against the acquittal of Naftzger.

He died at the age of 86 on January 11, 1934, in his home, 1704 Ocean View Avenue, Santa Monica. He was survived by his six children. His oldest son, Aurelius W. Hutton Jr. had died in 1895 at the age of 19.

References

1847 births
1934 deaths
University of Virginia alumni
Los Angeles City Attorneys
People from Greene County, Alabama
Superior court judges in the United States